Vasvár is a district in southern part of Vas County. Vasvár is also the name of the town where the district seat is found. The district is located in the Western Transdanubia Statistical Region.

Geography 
Vasvár District borders with Sárvár District to the northeast, Zalaszentgrót District (Zala County) to the southeast, Zalaegerszeg District (Zala County) to the south, Körmend District to the west, Szombathely District to the northwest. The number of the inhabited places in Vasvár District is 23.

Municipalities 
The district has 1 town and 22 villages.
(ordered by population, as of 1 January 2013)

The bolded municipality is the city.

Demographics

In 2011, it had a population of 13,767 and the population density was 37/km².

Ethnicity
Besides the Hungarian majority, the main minorities are the Roma (approx. 300) and German (200).

Total population (2011 census): 13,767
Ethnic groups (2011 census): Identified themselves: 12,709 persons:
Hungarians: 12,141 (95.53%)
Gypsies: 290 (2.28%)
Germans: 175 (1.38%)
Others and indefinable: 103 (0.81%)
Approx. 1,000 persons in Vasvár District did not declare their ethnic group at the 2011 census.

Religion
Religious adherence in the county according to 2011 census:

Catholic – 10,208 (Roman Catholic – 10,184; Greek Catholic – 20);
Evangelical – 223;
Reformed – 184;
other religions – 104; 
Non-religious – 368; 
Atheism – 52;
Undeclared – 2,628.

See also
List of cities and towns in Hungary

References

External links
 Postal codes of the Vasvár District

Districts in Vas County